Cyrano de Bergerac is a 1900 French short drama film directed by Clément Maurice, featuring Benoit Constant Coquelin as Cyrano. It was shown at the 1900 Paris Universal Exposition. The film, tinted with color and synchronized to a wax cylinder recording, is thought to be the first film made with both color and sound.

Plot summary

Cast
 Benoît-Constant Coquelin as Cyrano de Bergerac (as Coquelin ainé)

References

External links
 
 
 
 Film (internet archive

Early sound films
1900 films
French silent short films
French drama films
1900 drama films
Films directed by Clément Maurice
Films based on Cyrano de Bergerac (play)
Articles containing video clips
1900s French-language films
Silent drama films
1900s French films